Pomona may refer to:

Places

Argentina
 Pomona, Río Negro

Australia
 Pomona, Queensland, Australia, a town in the Shire of Noosa
 Pomona, New South Wales, Australia

Belize
 Pomona, Belize, a municipality in Stann Creek District

Mexico
 Pomona, Tabasco, a Mayan archeological site

Namibia
 Pomona, Namibia

New Zealand
 Pomona Island, New Zealand

South Africa
 Pomona, Kempton Park

United Kingdom
 Pomona, an old name for the Mainland of Orkney
 Pomona Docks, in Manchester, England

United States
 Pomona, California
 Pomona, Illinois
 Pomona, Kansas
 Pomona, Maryland
 Pomona, Michigan
 Pomona, Missouri
 Pomona, New Jersey
 Pomona, New York
 Pomona, Tennessee
 Pomona, Washington

Academic institutions
 California State Polytechnic University, Pomona, a public polytechnic university
 Pomona College, a liberal arts college in Claremont, California

Other uses
 Pomona (fruit survey), a treatise on or a survey of fruit varieties
 Pomona (mythology), the Roman goddess of fruit and nut trees
 Pomona (opera), a German-language opera by Reinhard Keiser
 Pomona (stage play), by Alistair McDowall
 Pomona station (disambiguation), train stations and tram stops
 Pomona, a ballet with music by Constant Lambert
 "Pomona", a waltz by Emile Waldteufel
 Professor Pomona Sprout, a character from the Harry Potter series by J.K. Rowling
 32 Pomona, an asteroid
 The Herefordshire Pomona, a nineteenth-century fruit catalogue
 Pomona Electronics
 HMS Pomona (1778) a 28 gun British naval frigate
 Pomona (sternwheeler) was an American river steamboat launched in 1898
 Pomona (1181 tons) was an American owned emigrant ship that sank in 1859 with the loss of 389 lives

See also
 Pomone (disambiguation)